Martano (Griko: , translit. ;) is a town and comune of 9,573 inhabitants in the province of Lecce in Apulia, Italy,  from Lecce and  from Otranto. It is the biggest town of Grecìa Salentina, a Greek-speaking area where some inhabitants can also speak a greek dialect called Griko.

Sights
The main attraction is the medieval castle in the old town centre, largely rebuilt in the 15th century retaining some features of the previous century, while the biggest churches are those devoted to the Mother of the Assumption and to Madonna del Rosario.

Notable people
Giuseppe Grassi, who signed the Constitution of Italy in 1948
 Salvatore Trinchese, marine biologist of the 19th century

Grecìa Salentina
Localities of Salento